Pigeon Mountain (officially Ōhuiarangi / Pigeon Mountain) is a  high volcanic cone and Tūpuna Maunga (ancestral mountain) at Half Moon Bay, near Howick and Bucklands Beach, in Auckland, New Zealand. It is part of the Auckland volcanic field.

Geography and history 
The volcano erupted around 24,000 years ago, forming a large crater and tuff ring about 500 meters wide. The prominent tuff ring is still clearly visible extending in an arc south of Sunderlands Road. Two much smaller craters were formed to the north west of the main cone. The smaller lies buried under Pigeon Mountain Road outside number 18, and the other forms Heights Park, a private reserve for the owners of 29–41 Pigeon Mountain Road and 14–36 Prince Regent Drive and 33–39 Tyrian Close. 

Ōhuiarangi is a Māori name meaning 'the desire of Rangi'.

Early European settlers saw many kererū, native wood pigeons, feeding on the pigeonwood trees there, hence the name Pigeon Mountain.

The mountain is a former pā site, and some of the terracing still remains. The mountain was extensively quarried from 1913 to the 1970s, with the entire north half of the volcano removed. It was first quarried for roading metal by Fencibles from the 1847 Fencibles settlement at Howick. In the 1920s the Shaw brothers worked with Harold Kearney, Dud Langdon and Jim Taylor using a pair of draught horses to pull a dray loaded with metal. In 1848 John Campbell and James Smyth, both from the fencible ship Sir Robert Sale, had the contract to spread metal on the road from Howick to Panmure, for which they were paid 5/- per day. At that time the mountain was named Pigeon Tree Hill.

The 5 acre farm immediately to the south was owned by the 1847 Irish Fitzpatrick family of Patrick and Ann who came in the Minerva fencible ship. They lived in a raupo hut at Howick for two years. They had had 12 children, 9 of whom survived. The children all attended Pakuranga school, a short distance across the paddocks to the south east. Fitzpatrick later bought other land around Pigeon Mountain at Hutchinson Road and Bucklands Beach Road, expanding his farm to 20 acres. A photo taken of the Pakuranga Cricket club, which played at Pigeon Mountain, shows 6 of the 16 players were from the Fitzpatrick family. His original fencibles cottage was still in use in the 1960s by two of his grandsons who were the caretakers of the Pigeon Mountain sports ground in their youth. On their death the cottage was placed at the Howick Historical village. A number of Fencibles' widows also received land south of Pigeon Mountain which was very swampy. Margaret Coyle received 4 acres of land where Pakuranga College is today. 

In 1929 a fresh water spring was uncovered and water was piped to Howick and district at a cost of 9340 pounds. 

Artefacts as well as skulls were found at the site in the 1960s by students from Pakuranga College.

In the southwest corner there is a playing field built on a free-draining scoria base. On the quarried northwestern side is a kindergarten and Scout hall.

Treaty settlement 
In the 2014 Treaty of Waitangi settlement between the Crown and the Ngā Mana Whenua o Tāmaki Makaurau collective of 13 Auckland iwi and hapu (also known as the Tāmaki Collective), ownership of the 14 Tūpuna Maunga of Auckland, was vested to the collective, including Ōhuiarangi / Pigeon Mountain. The legislation specified that the land be held in trust "for the common benefit of Ngā Mana Whenua o Tāmaki Makaurau and the other people of Auckland". The Tūpuna Maunga o Tāmaki Makaurau Authority or Tūpuna Maunga Authority (TMA) is the co-governance organisation established to administer the 14 Tūpuna Maunga. Auckland Council manages the Tūpuna Maunga under the direction of the TMA.

Native vegetation restoration 
As part of a plan to restore the hill, including native vegetation and native wildlife habitats, around 112 exotic trees, including pests, have been removed and 33,000 new native trees and shrubs are being planted. The work aims to and enhance sightlines to the summit and preserving historic features.

References 

Volcanoes of Auckland: A Field Guide. Hayward, B.W.; Auckland University Press, 2019, 335 pp. .

Auckland volcanic field
Parks in Auckland
Mountains of the Auckland Region
Howick Local Board Area